The 2018–19 Azerbaijan Premier League was the 27th season of the Azerbaijan Premier League. It was won by defending champions Qarabağ. The season began on 11 August 2018.

The winner of the league this season earned a spot in the first qualifying round of the 2019–20 Champions League, and the second and third placed clubs earned a place in the first qualifying round of the 2019–20 Europa League.

Teams
Kapaz was relegated at the conclusion of the previous season. Sabah were promoted and will participate in the Premier League this season.

Stadia and locations
Note: Table lists in alphabetical order.

Stadiums

Personnel and kits

Note: Flags indicate national team as has been defined under FIFA eligibility rules. Players may hold more than one non-FIFA nationality.

Foreign players
A team could use only six foreign players on the field in each game.

In bold: Players that capped for their national team.

Managerial changes

League table

Positions by round

Results
Clubs played each other four times for a total of 28 matches each.

Games 1–14

Games 15–28

Notes

Season statistics

Top scorers

Top assists

Hat-tricks

Clean sheets

Scoring
 First goal of the season: Mirabdulla Abbasov for Neftçi Baku against Sumgayit. (11 August 2018)

See also
 Azerbaijan Premier League
 Azerbaijan First Division

References

External links
UEFA

2018–19 in European association football leagues
2018-19
1